Glycine transporters (GlyTs) are plasmalemmal neurotransmitter transporters. They serve to terminate the signaling of glycine by mediating its reuptake from the synaptic cleft back into the  presynaptic neurons. There are two glycine transporters: glycine transporter 1 (GlyT1) and glycine transporter 2 (GlyT2).

See also
 Excitatory amino acid transporter
 GABA transporter
 Glycine receptor
 Glycine reuptake inhibitor

References

Membrane proteins
Neurotransmitter transporters
Solute carrier family